General elections were held in Monaco on 19 January 1958. The result was a victory for the National Union of Independents, which won 11 of the 18 seats in the National Council.

Results

References

Elections in Monaco
Monaco
1958 in Monaco
Election and referendum articles with incomplete results